Paul Edward Williams (born December 2, 1983)  is a former American football wide receiver. He was drafted by the Tennessee Titans in the third round of the 2007 NFL Draft. He played college football at Fresno State.

Williams has also been a member of the Houston Texans. Uncle of Lynn Williams, Uswnt forward.

College career

Statistics

External links
Tennessee Titans bio

1983 births
Living people
People from Hanford, California
Players of American football from California
American football wide receivers
Fresno State Bulldogs football players
Tennessee Titans players
Houston Texans players